Henri Charles de La Trémoille (17 December 1620 – 14 September 1672) was a French nobleman and military commander. He was the son of Henry de La Trémoille, duc of Thouars and of La Trémoille, and his wife, Marie de La Tour d'Auvergne.

In 1628, La Trémoille's father, Henri III of Trémoïlle, converted himself and his children to Catholicism, but La Trémoille's mother convinced him to reconvert to Protestantism when he reached the age of majority.  In 1638, he joined the army of his uncle, Frederick Henry, Prince of Orange.  In 1648, he married the Calvinist Émilie of Hesse-Kassel, the daughter of William V of Hesse-Kassel (or Hesse-Cassel).  They had five children, including Charles Belgique, his heir, and Charlotte Amélie de la Trémoille.

In October 1651, during the Fronde, he came out against Cardinal Mazarin and supported Condé openly.  As a result, in 1656 he was imprisoned in Amiens.  La Trémoille's mother obtained his release after several months of imprisonment.  He was then relegated in Poitou then turned over to serve in Holland.  In 1668, he returned from Holland to manage the affairs of the duchy of Thouars, his father being weakened by the gout, and he again re-converted to Catholicism, taking away the children from his wife who fled to the Netherlands.  He died two years before his father in 1672; it was thus his elder son, Charles, who succeeded as the fourth duke of Thouars.

1620 births
1672 deaths
Converts to Roman Catholicism from Calvinism
French Roman Catholics
Dukes of La Trémoille
Henri Charles
Dukes of Thouars
17th-century French people
People of Byzantine descent
17th-century peers of France